The  occurred in Suma, Kobe, Japan, on March 16 and May 27, 1997.

The perpetrator was arrested on June28, 1997 in connection with the Hase murder, and later confessed to both murders. As a juvenile offender, he was prosecuted and convicted as "BoyA". His real name has not been officially released to the press because Japanese law prohibits publishing the identification, but in some weekly magazines his real name has been reported as Shinichiro Azuma. Beginning in 2004, Azuma was released on provisional basis, with full release announced to follow on January1, 2005. The murders and subsequent release of the perpetrator gained widespread attention from Japanese media and politicians.

Murders

Hase had been beheaded with a handsaw, with further mutilations being done before being left in front of the school, for students to discover when they arrived in the morning. A note, written in red pen, was found stuffed in his mouth, identifying the killer as "Sakakibara". The note read:

"This is the beginning of the game... Try to stop me if you can you stupid police... I desperately want to see people die, it is a thrill for me to commit murder. A bloody judgment is needed for my years of great bitterness." Additionally, some misspelled English was on the note as well: "shooll killer".

Police commented that the style of Hase's killing and the note was reminiscent of that of the Zodiac murders in the San Francisco Bay Area during the late 1960s.

On June6, a letter was sent to the newspaper Kobe Shinbun, in which Sakakibara claimed responsibility for the slaying and decapitation of Jun Hase, and threatened that more killings would follow. This second letter, delivered in a brown envelope postmarked June3, had no return address or name. Enclosed was a three-page, 1400-word letter, also written in red ink, which included a six-character name that can be pronounced as "Sakakibara Seito". The same characters, which mean alcohol, devil, rose, saint and fight, were used in the first message that was inserted into the boy's mouth.

Beginning with the phrase "Now, it's the beginning of a game", the letter stated that "I am putting my life at stake for the sake of this game... If I'm caught, I'll probably be hanged... police should be angrier and more tenacious in pursuing me.... It's only when I kill that I am liberated from the constant hatred that I suffer and that I am able to attain peace. It is only when I give pain to people that I can ease my own pain." The letter also lashed out against the Japanese educational system, calling it "compulsory education that formed me, an invisible person."

In the initial panic, the Japanese media misreported the name as "Onibara" – Demon's Rose, though the killer insisted it was as he gave it. Infuriated by the mixup, Sakakibara later wrote to the station, "From now on, if you misread my name or spoil my mood I will kill three vegetables a week. If you think I can only kill children you are greatly mistaken." (Sakakibara's use of the term "vegetables" here refers to people around him; he had learned this term from his parents, who had once told him, "if you are nervous at your athletic meet, picture the people around you as vegetables.")

A 14-year-old junior high school student was arrested as a suspect in the Hase murder on June 28. Shortly after his arrest, "BoyA" also confessed to the murder of a 10-year-old girl, Ayaka Yamashita (山下彩花 Yamashita Ayaka), on March16, as well as the assaults of three other girls on and around that same date. After the March 16 attack, he wrote in his diary: "I carried out sacred experiments today to confirm how fragile human beings are... I brought the hammer down, when the girl turned to face me. I think I hit her a few times but I was too excited to remember." The following week, on March23, he added: "This morning my mom told me, 'Poor girl. The girl attacked seems to have died.' There is no sign of me being caught... I thank you, "Bamoidōkishin", for this... Please continue to protect me." The meaning or identity of "Bamoidōkishin" remains unclear.

Aftermath and controversy
After the murders, Japanese politician Shizuka Kamei called for restricting objectionable content, stating, "Movies lacking any literary or educational merit made for just showing cruel scenes... Adults should be blamed for this", and that "[the incident] gives adults the chance to rethink the policy of self-imposed restrictions on these films and whether they should allow them just because they are profitable."

In 2000, Japan's bicameral legislature lowered the age for criminal responsibility from 16 to 14. However, in the wake of the June1, 2004 murder of Satomi Mitarai by 11-year-old "GirlA" (Sasebo slashing), there has been some discussion for the need for further revision.

On March11, 2004, in an unprecedented act, the Japanese Ministry of Justice announced that Sakakibara, 21 at the time, was being released on a provisional basis, with a full release to follow on January 1,2005. Critics have charged that since the government had taken the unusual step of notifying the public, that Sakakibara was likely not fit for release and should be transferred to prison. In the wake of the Sasebo slashing, three months later, this criticism was exacerbated.

Due to the seriousness of the crimes and the fact that they had been committed by a minor, his name and new residence to this day remain a highly guarded secret. Nonetheless, his real name has been circulated on the internet since June29, 1997, according to journalist Fumihiko Takayama.

A number of people, including Shōjirō Gotō (a lawyer who dealt with many false accusation cases), Hidehiko Kumagai, and Nobuyoshi Iwata (former principal of the junior high school that BoyA attended), insist that BoyA was wrongfully accused and point out contradictions in the statements of the investigating authorities. Some examples:

 Police investigators said that one of the murders was made by a left-handed BoyA is right-handed.
 BoyA's confession contained many absurd statements and claims of things that would be impossible for a 14-year-old to do.
 BoyA had bad grades, and yet his confession was complex (if cryptic) and contained many elaborate figures of speech and similes.

In 2002, the boy's mother visited him in prison and asked him if he had really committed the crimes.  He affirmed this to her.

In June 2015, Sakakibara, then aged 32, released an autobiography through Ohta Publishing titled Zekka (絶歌), in which he claimed to express regret for his crimes and recounted the murders in graphic detail. Despite attempts by Jun Hase's family to block the release of Zekka, and despite one bookstore chain refusing to stock the book, it quickly reached the top of Japanese bestseller lists. A few months later, Sakakibara set up a vanity website in which he posted bizarre photoshopped images of a nude male, suggested to be himself. In response to these controversies, the tabloid Shūkan Post publicized Sakakibara's real name of Shinichiro Azuma, as well as his location and occupation at the time.

See also

List of major crimes in Japan
Neomugicha incident
Sasebo slashing
Son of Sam law
Zodiac Killer

Notes

References

External links
Sympathy for the devil Al-Ahram Weekly, March 18, 1999
神戸事件の真相を究明する会 The meeting which studies the truth of Kobe case

1997 murders in Japan
Japanese murderers of children
Minors convicted of murder
Murder committed by minors
Murdered Japanese children
People from Kobe
Serial murders in Japan
Violence against children